Aleksandr Ivanovich Myasnikov (born May 8, 1959) is a retired field hockey player from Russia, who won the bronze medal with the Men's National Field Hockey Team from the Soviet Union at the 1980 Summer Olympics in Moscow. He represented the Soviet Union again at the 1988 Summer Olympics in Seoul.

References

External links
 

1959 births
Living people
Sportspeople from Samara Oblast
Russian male field hockey players
Olympic field hockey players of the Soviet Union
Soviet male field hockey players
Field hockey players at the 1980 Summer Olympics
Field hockey players at the 1988 Summer Olympics
Olympic bronze medalists for the Soviet Union
Olympic medalists in field hockey
People from Syzran
Medalists at the 1980 Summer Olympics